Oleksandr Vasylyev (born 27 April 1994) is a Ukrainian professional footballer who plays as a midfielder for Chornomorets Odesa.

Career
Vasylyev is a product of the FC Dynamo Kyiv Youth Sportive School System. His first trainer was Vyacheslav Semenov.

He made his debut for FC Dnipro in the match against FC Shakhtar Donetsk on 23 May 2015 in the Ukrainian Premier League.

References

External links

1994 births
Living people
Footballers from Kyiv
Ukrainian footballers
Association football midfielders
Ukrainian expatriate footballers
Expatriate footballers in Belarus
Ukrainian Premier League players
FC Dynamo Kyiv players
FC Dnipro players
FC Arsenal Kyiv players
FC Minsk players
FC Gomel players
FC Lviv players
Ukrainian expatriate sportspeople in Belarus
Ukraine youth international footballers
Ukraine under-21 international footballers
Ukrainian First League players